This is a list of Ice Road Truckers Season 3 episodes.

Season 3 of Ice Road Truckers premiered on May 31, 2009 and covers the Dalton Highway, which connects Fairbanks, Alaska, Coldfoot, Alaska, and Deadhorse, Alaska near Prudhoe Bay, Alaska, as well as ice roads constructed over the Arctic Ocean in the Prudhoe Bay area. However, the combination of avalanches, strong Arctic winds leading to whiteouts, and unforgiving terrain has led to hundreds of accidents in the past years. Two thousand loads must be moved up the road within 12 weeks, before the ice melts on the Arctic Ocean.
The tagline for the season is: "In the Dark Heart of Alaska, there's a road where hell has frozen over". In this season the 2009 Mount Redoubt eruptive activity caused complications; the truckers had to carry many loads which were intended for flight, but the planes could not fly because of volcanic ash in the air.

The season finale aired on August 23, 2009.

Drivers

Hugh Rowland and Alex Debogorski take part in this season as newcomers to the Dalton Highway in Alaska, working alongside the following local drivers at Carlile Transportation.

Jack Jessee: A 38-year-old veteran driver and Virginia native, Jessee has 15 years of ice road trucking experience to his credit. He has earned a reputation as a "heavy hauler" who specializes in moving massive and/or oversized loads. In his introduction on the show's website, he offers this opinion about driving the Alaska roads: "You learn the road really fast… or you end up dead."
George Spears: Spears, 59, is a respected veteran driver in Alaska. He has been driving the ice roads for 29 years and helping rookies get used to the hazards. In the season premiere, he remarks about an incident in which he flipped his own truck over a cliff one year. He intends to retire at the end of this season, his 30th.
Lisa Kelly: A former school bus driver and state Freestyle Motocross champion, Kelly is starting her second year on the ice roads. At 28, she is the youngest female driver this year, and hopes to earn the veteran truckers’ respect and become Carlile's first female heavy hauler. In Season 4, the Wasilla resident stated that she had to sell the first horse she ever kept as a pet and was trying to earn enough money to buy it back, a goal she eventually accomplished.
Tim Freeman Jr.: A 23-year-old ice road rookie from Blackduck, Minnesota, Freeman is a fourth-generation trucker with several years of over-the-road driving experience. Family friend George Spears has been helping him prepare for the challenge of driving Alaska's roads.
Carey Hall: The son and grandson of truckers in his native Louisiana, Hall, a 45-year-old African American, is known on the Alaskan ice as "Big Daddy" and is universally respected for his professionalism. He appears in one episode, driving with Jessee to deliver a pair of enormous storage tanks.
Phil Kromm: A 15-year veteran fuel-hauler from Alaska, Phil is also in charge of safety, recruitment, and driver training to get rookie drivers accustomed to the Dalton Highway (most notably Debogorski in Season 3, and Redmon and Sieber in Season 5). He is also Lane Keator's advisor on rookie progression. Despite his never being a main character in any of the future seasons, he plays a vital role in rookie training and has a hand in determining some of the rookies' being fired. (Fellow veteran driver Tony Molesky rides with Rowland on his first trip up the Dalton, and joined the cast in Season 5.)
Jack McCahan: Veteran Carlile driver who serves as one of Debogorski's escorts until he gets fed up with Alex's "rookie s***" in that he takes so long to chain up his tires.

Support personnel
Lane Keator: Fairbanks Terminal Manager for Carlile. Among his responsibilities are making the final decisions on hiring, firing, promoting and demoting drivers.
Tim Rickards: Fairbanks Dispatcher for Carlile. He assigns loads for the drivers.
Jerid Lane: Mechanic at Carlile's Fairbanks repair shop. He keeps the trucks running.
Roberta Klema: Driving instructor for Carlile Fairbanks. She puts new drivers through a driving simulator to familiarize them with the Kenworth tractors Carlile uses, as well as a preview of conditions they'll face when driving the Dalton.
John McCoy: Driving instructor for Carlile Fairbanks. He gives physical road tests to new drivers behind the wheel of a typical Kenworth cab and trailer.
Harry McDonald: Carlile CEO. In episode 1, he describes the challenge they face this season moving 2,000 loads to Prudhoe Bay in 60 days, and gives a very brief history of the company he co-founded with his brother in 1980 in episode 4.
Greg Thompson: Carlile Heavy Haul Manager. In episode 2, he says that they need "the best of the best" drivers for hauling special loads like Jessee does, "because a lot of guys won’t do it, they’re afraid of it".
Reid Bahnson: Alaska Department of Transportation & Public Facilities avalanche technician. He leads a crew that triggers avalanches so natural ones are less likely to impact truckers and freight on the Dalton. His weapon of choice is a Korean War-era recoilless rifle that shoots 8-lb TNT mortars into avalanche chutes.
Donald Adkins: Grader operator for Alaska DoT&PF. He helps prepare and maintain the Dalton for the truckers, and helps pull out those who get stuck in snowdrifts.
Ken Bear: Plow driver for Alaska DoT&PF. He is one of many who plow the Dalton after snowstorms and avalanches.
Dan Schok: Project engineer for Flowline, supplier of the 34-inch-diameter 130-foot-long pipe being transported by Jessee in episode 2.
Ben Kryzkowski: Owner of Ben's Towing. He has 25 years of experience removing wrecked trucks from the Dalton.
Terrence Cole: Professor and Historian from the University of Alaska. He appears to describe the impact of oil discoveries and the construction of the Dalton and the pipeline.

Route and destinations

Dalton Highway:
 Fairbanks, Alaska: Home of Carlile Transportation's Fairbanks terminal, the main trucking company featured in Seasons 3 and 4, and one of several featured in Seasons 5 and 6.
 Coldfoot, Alaska: Home of the only rest stop on the Dalton Highway, serving as a stopping point for truckers when bad weather closes the road and the only services on the Dalton between Fairbanks and Deadhorse.
 Deadhorse, Alaska: Home of Carlile's Prudhoe Bay terminal and the northern terminus of the Dalton Highway. Ice roads extend from here over the Arctic Ocean and adjoining rivers, allowing truckers to reach the offshore oil rigs in Prudhoe Bay as well as other communities to the west.

Final load counts
Jessee — 20
Spears — 15
Kelly — 15
Rowland — 13
Debogorski — 12
Freeman — 11

Episodes

References 

 

2009 American television seasons
Ice Road Truckers seasons